Canova is an unincorporated community in Prince William County, Virginia.  The community is located on Canova Drive, a former section of State Route 234, about 1 mile and a half north of Hoadly Road.  The town consists of a church and multiple housing areas. There used to be a country store and gas station, but after SR 234 (Dumfries Road) was realigned and widened in 2005 it bypassed the town, and forced it to close.

References

Unincorporated communities in Prince William County, Virginia
Washington metropolitan area
Unincorporated communities in Virginia